Kharal Abbasian is a village north-east of Bagh District headquarters in Pakistan.

Populated places in Bagh District